Urho Kähönen (6 July 1910, Terijoki - 3 August 1984) was a Finnish agronomist, civil servant and politician. He served as Minister of Agriculture from 14 November 1958 to 13 January 1959. He was a member of the Parliament of Finland from 1951 to 1966, representing the Agrarian League (which changed its name to Centre Party in 1965).

References

1910 births
1984 deaths
People from Zelenogorsk, Saint Petersburg
People from Viipuri Province (Grand Duchy of Finland)
Centre Party (Finland) politicians
Ministers of Agriculture of Finland
Members of the Parliament of Finland (1951–54)
Members of the Parliament of Finland (1954–58)
Members of the Parliament of Finland (1958–62)
Members of the Parliament of Finland (1962–66)